Canada Research Chair (CRC) is a title given to certain Canadian university research professors by the Canada Research Chairs Program.

Program goals 
The Canada Research Chair program was established in 2000 as a part of the Government of Canada wanting to promote research and development excellence in Canadian post-secondary educational institutions. Through the Canada Research Chair program, $300 million is spent annually to attract and retain outstanding scholars and scientists.

The program hopes to help chairholders achieve research excellence in natural sciences, engineering, health sciences, humanities, and social sciences, improve Canada's depth of knowledge and quality of life, strengthen the country's international competitiveness, and train personnel through student supervision, teaching, and the coordination of other researchers' work.

Types of chairs 
There are two types of Canada Research Chair:
Tier 1 Chairs – tenable for seven years and renewable once (and twice in exceptional circumstances), are for outstanding researchers acknowledged by their peers as world leaders in their fields. Nominees for Tier 1 positions are full professors or associate professors who are expected to be promoted to the full professor level within one or two years of the nomination (or, if coming from outside the academic sector, nominees must possess the necessary qualifications to be appointed at these levels by the nominating university). For each Tier 1 Chair, the university receives $200,000 annually for seven years.
Tier 2 Chairs – tenable for five years and renewable once, are for exceptional emerging researchers, acknowledged by their peers as having the potential to lead in their field. Nominees for Tier 2 positions are assistant or associate professors (or they possess the necessary qualifications to be appointed at these levels by the nominating university). For each Tier 2 Chair, the university receives $100,000 annually for five years.

The money received for each chair can be used to add to the chair's salary, to help pay for the chair's existing salary, or to fund research; the proportion allocated to each category varies by university.

Chair allocations 
The number of CRCs allocated to a university is proportional to the amount of research grant funding that university has received in the three years prior to the year of the allocation. Grant funding must originate from the three federal granting agencies (NSERC, CIHR, and SSHRC).

Of the total 2000 Chairs, 1880 are regular allocations, distributed as follows:
 733 Chairs (39 per cent) for research in natural sciences and engineering;
 733 Chairs (39 per cent) for research in health sciences;
 414 Chairs (22 per cent) for research in social sciences and humanities.

The program sets aside a special allocation of 120 Chairs for universities that have received one per cent or less of the total funding paid out by the three federal granting agencies over the preceding three years.

Roughly 66% of Chairs are allocated to member institutions of the U15, a group of the top research-intensive universities in Canada.

List of Canada Research Chairs

The Canada Research Chairs Program maintains an online database of profiles of each chairholder, which include detailed descriptions of each of their research projects.

Canada Research Chairs insignia
On March 27, 2008, the Government of Canada's Ministry of Industry, as well as the presidents of the Social Sciences and Humanities Research Council of Canada, the Canada Foundation for Innovation, the Natural Sciences and Engineering Research Council and the Canadian Institutes of Health Research presented each chairholder with a Canada Research Chair insignia at a national celebration of the program held at the Université du Québec en Outaouais in Gatineau, Quebec. The lapel pin, made of sterling silver, symbolizes the pursuit of knowledge and research excellence and is available exclusively to chairholders.  As of November 2007, there are 1,851 Canada Research Chairs.  Seventy Canadian universities are participating in the program.

References

External links 
 

Universities and colleges in Canada
Federal departments and agencies of Canada
Innovation, Science and Economic Development Canada